Hutschenreuther is the name of a German family that established the production of porcelain in northern Bavaria, starting in 1814.

History
The Hutschenreuther porcelain business was founded in 1814 by Carolus Magnus Hutschenreuther (1794–1845) in Hohenberg an der Eger, Bavaria, Germany. He had previously worked at the Wallendorf porcelain manufactory in Lichte (Wallendorf).

After his death in 1845, the factory was headed by his widow, Johanna Hutschenreuther, and her two sons. A large part of the factory was destroyed by a fire in 1848, but it was rebuilt. From 1860, they produced hand-painted and gilded porcelain products.

Lorenz Hutschenreuther, Selb 
In 1857, Lorenz Hutschenreuther, the elder son of Carolus Magnus Hutschenreuther, established a porcelain factory in Selb. They expanded from 1902 to 1969 and were named Porzellanfabriken Lorenz Hutschenreuther AG Selb (Lorenz Hutschenreuther Porcelain Factories Company, Selb).

Hutschenreuther acquired the following other porcelain manufacturers:
 Jaeger, Werner & Co., Selb (1906)
 Paul Mueller, Selb (1917)
 Bauscher brothers, Weiden (1927)
 Tirschenreuth porcelain factory (1927)
 Königszelt porcelain factory, Königszelt (today Jaworzyna Śląska), Silesia (1928)

In 1969, Porzellanfabriken Lorenz Hutschenreuther AG Selb merged with C. M. Hutschenreuther of Hohenberg.

See also
 Porcelain manufacturing companies in Europe

References

Fritz, Bernd: Gebrauchsporzellan des 20. Jahrhunderts, Klinkhardt & Biermann, Munich & Berlin 1995  
Singer, Friedrich Wilhelm: Arzberger Bilderbuch, Arzberg 1974,  no ISBN

External links
 
 Hutschenreuther marks by date
 

Manufacturing companies established in 1814
Ceramics manufacturers of Germany
19th-century establishments in Bavaria
German families
German brands
Companies based in Bavaria
Hohenberg an der Eger
German companies established in 1814